Abu Hamid Ahmed ibn Mohammed al-Saghani al-Asturlabi (referred to by at least one source as Ṣāghānī, was a Persian astronomer and historian of science. His name means "the astrolabe maker of Saghan, near Merv". He flourished in Baghdad, where he died in 990.

Works
Al-Asturlabi wrote some of the earliest comments on the history of science. These included the following comparison between the "ancients" (including the ancient Babylonians, Egyptians, Greeks and Indians) and the "modern scholars" (the Muslim scientists of his time):

{{quote|"The ancients distinguished themselves through their chance discovery of basic principles and the invention of ideas. The modern scholars, on the other hand, distinguish themselves through the invention of a multitude of scientific details, the simplification of difficult (problems), the combination of scattered (information), and the explanation of (material which already exists in) coherent (form). The ancients came to their particular achievements by virtue of their priority in time, and not on account of any natural qualification and intelligence. Yet, how many things escaped them which then became the original inventions of modern scholars, and how much did the former leave for the latter to do."

References

Sources
  (PDF version)

Further reading
 
 

Mathematicians from the Abbasid Caliphate
Astronomers from the Abbasid Caliphate
Astronomers of the medieval Islamic world
10th-century Iranian mathematicians
990 deaths
Historians of science
Year of birth unknown
10th-century Iranian astronomers
10th-century people from the Abbasid Caliphate